Joseph Yuosang Yun (born 1954) is the U.S. Special Presidential Envoy for Compact Negotiations, appointed in March 2022 by President Joe Biden to negotiate amendments to the Compact of Free Association (COFA), the agreement governing the relationship between the United States and the Freely Associated States (FAS) of the Federated States of Micronesia, the Marshall Islands, and Palau. 

A 33-year career diplomat and seasoned negotiator, Ambassador Yun is an expert on Asia-Pacific affairs, having served multiple tours throughout the region and within the State Department. Previous senior diplomatic assignments include U.S. Special Representative for North Korea Policy, U.S. Ambassador to Malaysia, and Principal Deputy Assistant Secretary in the State Department Bureau of East Asian and Pacific Affairs, He is recognized as one of the nation's leading experts on North Korea, as well as on broader East Asian policy.

Early life and education
Born in Seoul, Yun left South Korea for Nigeria in 1964, following his father, a doctor with the World Health Organization. Yun was educated from middle school on in the United Kingdom, earning his bachelor's degree from Cardiff University in 1976, and Master of Science and Master of Philosophy degrees from the London School of Economics. He met his wife, Melanie Billings-Yun, at LSE and they were married in 1977. They have one son, Matthew Yun.

Diplomatic career 
Yun joined the United States Foreign Service in 1985. In 2000, following tours in Hong Kong, Indonesia, Washington, DC, Paris, and Seoul, he was appointed Economic Counselor in the U.S. Embassy in Bangkok, managing economic, labor and environmental issues. In 2004 he attended the Asia Pacific Center for Security Studies, then took a 6-month assignment as senior adviser on the State Department Korea Desk. He returned to the U.S. Embassy in Seoul in 2005 as the Minister-Counselor for Political Affairs, in charge of domestic, regional, and bilateral political issues.

In 2009 Yun was posted back in Washington as  Director of the State Department Office of Maritime Southeast Asia. The following year he was named Deputy Assistant Secretary for Southeast Asia, and in 2011 he was appointed Principal Deputy Assistant Secretary for the Bureau of East Asian and Pacific Affairs (EAP). During his time in EAP, Yun worked closely on President Obama's Asian rebalance policy, especially in Southeast Asia. Notable accomplishments included the diplomatic normalization of American relations with Myanmar, the establishment of a US mission for ASEAN, and the inauguration of United States participation in the annual East Asian Summit.

For his work, the State Department has honored him with a Presidential Meritorious Service Award, three Superior Honors Awards, and nine Foreign Service Performance Awards.

Ambassador to Malaysia 
Nominated by President Barack Obama to serve as Ambassador to Malaysia on July 23, 2013, Yun was confirmed by the U.S. Senate on August 1. As Ambassador, Yun emphasized stronger bilateral ties between the United States and Malaysia in all aspects: security, diplomatic, economic and people-to-people. During his three-year tenure, President Obama visited Malaysia twice, in 2014 and 2015. Prior to those trips, the last US President to visit Malaysia was Lyndon B. Johnson in 1966. During his 2014 visit, President Obama and Prime Minister Najib Razak signed the Comprehensive Partnership Agreement, pledging the United States and Malaysia to work closely together on security, business, education and technology issues. Yun also inaugurated the Oregon-Sabah Collaborative, bringing together private citizens, local governments, universities and civil society from the two states to promote educational exchange, forest and wildlife conservation, and business ties. For his work in this area, Yun received the Individual Achievement Award from the Oregon Consular Corps in 2016.

Special Representative for North Korea Policy 
On October 17, 2016, Yun assumed the office of United States Special Representative for North Korea Policy, heading all coordination and implementation of U.S. policy toward North Korea, especially concerning denuclearization. Concurrently, he held the office of Deputy Assistant Secretary for Korea and Japan, managing relations with America's principal allies in developing a coordinated policy toward North Korea.

Yun was the key diplomat securing the release of American student Otto Warmbier who had been imprisoned in North Korea for nearly a year and a half. In May 2017, Yun met secretly in Oslo with North Korean officials to gain diplomatic access to the four American prisoners held in Pyongyang. Learning on June 6 that Warmbier had been in a vegetative state for the past 15 months, Yun flew with a medical team on an emergency mission to Pyongyang to secure his immediate release on "humanitarian grounds". He and the team returned Warmbier to his parents' care in the United States on June 12. While in Pyongyang, Yun also conducted a consular visit with the remaining American prisoners, the first since March 2016.

As part of the agreement to release Warmbier, the North Koreans demanded $2 million as "repayment for medical expenses." Yun confirmed that he signed a pledge to pay that sum on the direct instructions of Secretary of State Rex Tillerson. However, Trump said in April 2019 that no money had ever been paid. In the book The Madman Theory by Jim Sciutto, Yun stated that they started with believing that only Kim Jong Un was unpredictable but they eventually had to accept that Donald Trump was as unpredictable and that they had to be "careful what options you gave him (Trump)" because any option you put out there, he could use. Yun said that the White House was looking at all options however extreme, but it was then-Secretary James Mattis that refused to provide certain options for this reason.

Special Presidential Envoy for Compact Negotiations 
Yun retired from the U.S. State Department on March 2, 2018, He took positions as Senior Advisor with The Asia Group and the United States Institute of Peace and became a regular analyst on North Korea for CNN. In March 2022 the Biden Administration brought him back as Special Presidential Envoy to revive the COFA negotiations with the three strategically important Pacific Island countries of Micronesia, Marshall Islands, and Palau, which had been stalled since December 2020. Recently the region had been receiving economic overtures from China, key issues include economic assistance stemming from historic U.S. nuclear testing on the islands, the continuing presence of U.S. military bases and the ballistic missile test site at Kwajalein Atoll, and climate change mitigation. Provisions in the compact are set to expire in 2023 for the first countries and in 2024 for Palau.

See also
 Human rights in North Korea
 Korean Americans in New York City
 North Korea-United States relations

References

External links
 
 Biography, US Department of State

1954 births
Alumni of the London School of Economics
Alumni of the University of Wales
Ambassadors of the United States to Malaysia
21st-century American diplomats
American people of Korean descent
Living people
Place of birth missing (living people)
United States Special Envoys
United States Foreign Service personnel